Adin Mulaosmanović (born 1 January 1977) is a Bosnian professional football manager and former player.

Playing career
Born in Sarajevo, Mulaosmanović previously played for hometown club Željezničar, where he won the league title 2 times, cup 3 times and the supercup also 3 times. He also played both 2002–03 UEFA Champions League qualifying round matches against Newcastle United. After seven years of playing for Željezničar, he left the club in 2005 and signed a contract with Jedinstvo Bihać. Mulaosmanović also played in North Macedonia and Albania for Renova and Elbasani, before returning to Bosnia and Herzegovina and joining Bratstvo Gračanica in 2007, where he retired in 2011 at the age of 34.

Managerial career
Mulaosmanović worked as an assistant manager at his former club Željezničar from 2017 to 2022. He was assistant manager during the managing tenures of Admir Adžem, Slobodan Krčmarević, Milomir Odović, Amar Osim, Blaž Slišković, Tomislav Ivković and Edis Mulalić.

From 27 November to 31 December 2018, Mulaosmanović and other former Željezničar assistant manager Ismet Štilić were both dual-caretaker managers of the club after Milomir Odović resigned as manager. Both worked as caretakers until the club named Amar Osim as its new manager.

On 31 January 2019, Mulaosmanović was named the new interim head coach of the Bosnia and Herzegovina national U-17 football team. He was sacked on 21 December 2019, after Nermin Šabić became the new head coach.

In June 2022, Velež Mostar appointed Mulaosmanović as the club's new assistant manager, following Amar Osim becoming its manager.

Honours

Player
Željezničar 
Bosnian Premier League: 1997–98, 2000–01, 2001–02
Bosnian Cup: 1999–00, 2000–2001, 2002–03
Bosnian Supercup: 1998, 2000, 2001

Bratstvo Gračanica 
Second League of FBiH: 2010–11 (North)

References

External links
Adin Mulaosmanović at Soccerbase.com

1977 births
Living people
Footballers from Sarajevo
Association football defenders
Bosnia and Herzegovina footballers
FK Željezničar Sarajevo players
NK Jedinstvo Bihać players
FK Renova players
KF Elbasani players
NK Bratstvo Gračanica players
Premier League of Bosnia and Herzegovina players
Macedonian First Football League players
Kategoria Superiore players
First League of the Federation of Bosnia and Herzegovina players
Bosnia and Herzegovina expatriate footballers
Expatriate footballers in North Macedonia
Bosnia and Herzegovina expatriate sportspeople in North Macedonia
Expatriate footballers in Albania
Bosnia and Herzegovina expatriate sportspeople in Albania
Bosnia and Herzegovina football managers
FK Željezničar Sarajevo managers
Premier League of Bosnia and Herzegovina managers